The New Orleans Saints are a professional American football team based in New Orleans, Louisiana. They are a member of the South Division of the National Football Conference (NFC) in the National Football League (NFL). The NFL awarded the city of New Orleans the 16th franchise in the league on November 1, 1966, All Saints Day, five months after the 89th United States Congress approved the merger of the NFL with the American Football League (AFL) in June of that year. In January 1967, the team was given the current "New Orleans Saints" name, and began playing in their first season in September of that year. Since the franchise's creation, it has been based in New Orleans. The team's home games were originally played at Tulane Stadium from 1967 to 1974, it was demolished in 1979, when the team relocated its home games to its current stadium, the Mercedes-Benz Superdome (formerly Louisiana Superdome from 1975 to 2011).

The New Orleans Saints have had 16 head coaches in their franchise history—ten full-time coaches and six interim coaches. Sean Payton was the head coach of the Saints from 2006 to 2021. Payton served as the assistant head coach/passing game coordinator and assistant head coach/quarterbacks for the Dallas Cowboys for three seasons before he joined the Saints in 2006. In the 2009 season, he led the team to its second NFC Championship Game and first NFC Championship title, Super Bowl (XLIV) appearance, and NFL Championship. Tom Fears, the franchise's first head coach serving from 1967 to 1970, was inducted into the Pro Football Hall of Fame in 1970, and is the only coach to be inducted into the Hall of Fame while spending his entire coaching career with the Saints. Hank Stram, who coached the Saints from 1976 to 1977, and Mike Ditka, who coached the Saints from 1997 to 1999, were also inducted into the Hall of Fame in 2003 and 1988, respectively. Sean Payton has coached the most games for the Saints, with 192. Payton has the highest winning percentage while coaching the Saints, with .615, and his 118 wins are the most in franchise history. J. D. Roberts has the lowest winning percentage (.219) and fewest wins (seven) for a full-time coach. Jim Haslett, Mora, and Payton are the only head coaches to lead the Saints into the playoffs. Mora, Haslett, and Payton have won the AP Coach of the Year Award and the Sporting News NFL Coach of the Year.

Key

Coaches
Note: Statistics are accurate through the end of the 2021 NFL season.

Notes

References

 
New Orleans Saints
Head coaches